Joseph Fiévée (9 April 1767 - 9 May 1839) was a French journalist, novelist, essayist, playwright, civil servant (haut fonctionnaire) and secret agent.  He also lived in an openly gay relationship with the writer Théodore Leclercq (1777-1851), with whom he was buried after his death.

Career

Fiévée was born and died in Paris.  The son of a restaurant owner, he became a publisher during the French Revolution, most notably editing La Chronique de Paris, a newspaper; it was here that he started his career as journalist, but unfortunately incurred the suspicion of authorities who had him imprisoned during the Reign of Terror.  He was a member of the royalist network around the Abbey de Montesquiou, and was forced to go into hiding during the Directoire.  While in hiding, he wrote his novel on changing times and mores, La Dot de Suzette, which was a great literary success.

From 1800 to 1803, he wrote a column for the Gazette de France.  He was again imprisoned in the Temple (Paris) by order of Joseph Fouché, but he was freed at the request of Bonaparte.  He became a kind of secret agent for Napoleon, informing him of political affairs in France and England.

From 1804 to 1807, he was editor in chief of the  Journal des débats, which became Journal de l'Empire.  He was ennobled by the Emperor;  was named "maître des requêtes" to the Conseil d'État in 1810; then "Préfet" of the Nièvre départment from 1813 to 1815.

A supporter of Louis XVIII of France during the initial Restoration, he was banished during the Hundred Days.  Having become one of the intellectuals of the "ultra" party and writer for the papers La Quotidienne and the Conservateur, he eventually became more politically liberal after 1818. A strong supporter of the freedom of the press, he was sentenced to three months of prison in the Conciergerie where Casimir Perier visited him.

He became a contributor to the journals Temps in 1829 and National in 1831.

Private life
Joseph Fiévée married in 1790 (his brother-in-law was Charles Frédéric Perlet), but his wife died giving birth, leaving him one child.  At the end of the 1790s, he met the writer Théodore Leclercq who became his life companion, and the two would live and raise Fiévée's son together.  When becoming Préfet, Fiévée and Leclercq moved to the Nièvre department, and their open relationship greatly shocked some locals.  The two men were received together in the salons of the Restoration.

Both men are buried in the same tomb at Père Lachaise Cemetery.

Works
Novels :
La Dot de Suzette (1798) (BNF 1)
Frédéric (1799) (BNF 2)

Letters :
Lettres sur l'Angleterre (1803)
, Ed. Le Normant (1816)
Lettres sur le projet d'organisation municipale (présentées à la Chambre des Députés le 21 février 1821), Le Normant (1821)
, en 3 volumes, Ed. Desrez et Beauvais (1836)

Essays :
De la religion considérée dans ses rapports avec le but de toute législation (1795)
Du dix-huit brumaire opposé au système de la Terreur (1802) (BNF 3)
Réflexions sur la philosophie du XVIIIe siècle, Ed. Perlet-Desenne (1802)
Conseils à Napoléon 1802-1803
Des opinions et des intérêts pendant la Révolution (1809)
Histoire de la session de 1815, Ed. L'Huillier-Delaunay (1816)
Histoire de la session de 1816, Le Normant (1817)
Histoire de la session de 1817, Le Normant (1818)
Examen des discussions relatives à la loi des élections pendant la session de 1819, Le Normant (1820)
Histoire de la session de 1820, Le Normant (1821)
Ce que tout le monde pense, ce que personne ne dit, Le Normant (1821)
De l'Espagne et des conséquences de l'intervention armée (1823)
Causes et conséquences du mois de juillet 1830 (1830)

Short Stories:
Le divorce, le faux révolutionnaire et l'héroïsme des femmes, Ed. A. Duleau (1802)

Theatre :
La maison à vendre (1789)
Le badinage dangereux (1789)
Les rigueurs du cloître (1790)

Honors
Chevalier de la Légion d'honneur (1812)

References
 Cavalier, Auguste.  1902.
 Martin, Jean-Clément. Conservatisme, journalisme, et opinion publique sous la Restauration : le paradoxe du succès de Joseph Fiévée. Rennes: Presses universitaires de Rennes, 2001.
 Popkin, Jeremy D. Joseph Fiévée, imprimeur, écrivain, journaliste: une carrière dans le monde du livre pendant la Révolution. 1988.
 Tulard, Jean. Joseph Fiévée, conseiller secret de Napoléon.  Collection: Les Inconnus de l'histoire.  Paris: Fayard, 1985. Contains the "Petit dictionnaire fiévéien".
 Thuillier, Guy. Témoins de l'administration (Joseph Fiévée et l'administration impériale). Ed. Berger-Levrault, 1967.

External links
 
 

1767 births
1839 deaths
18th-century French dramatists and playwrights
French journalists
18th-century French novelists
19th-century French novelists
French gay writers
French LGBT journalists
Writers from Paris
French LGBT dramatists and playwrights
French LGBT novelists
French male essayists
French male dramatists and playwrights
French male novelists
19th-century French male writers
18th-century essayists
19th-century French essayists
18th-century French male writers